Thomas Blackwell (1660–1728) was a Church of Scotland minister who was principal of Marischal College in Aberdeen from 1717 to 1728.

Life
He was born in 1660 the son of Thomas Blackwell calenderer in Glasgow and his wife, Janet Knox. He was educated at Glasgow University training as a minister. He was licensed to preach as a Church of Scotland minister by the Presbytery of Glasgow in February 1693.

He was ordained at Paisley Abbey in August 1694. In November 1700 he translated to "second charge" of the Kirk of St Nicholas in Aberdeen. In May 1711 he moved to first charge of Greyfriars Church, Aberdeen. He was awarded a Doctor of Divinity (DD) and adopted a second role as Professor of Divinity at Marischal College in the same year.

From 1714 to 1728 he was Patron of the Seven Incorporated Trades of Aberdeen.

In 1717 he succeeded Robert Paterson as principal of Marischal College. A senior figure in the Church of Scotland, he travelled to London with William Carstares of Edinburgh University to discuss the Patronage and Toleration Act in the run up to the Act of Union 1707. This led to the Church Patronage (Scotland) Act 1711.

He died on 3 October 1728. He is buried in the churchyard of the Kirk of St Nicholas in central Aberdeen.

Family
He married Christian Johnston (d.1749) daughter of John Johnston of Glasgow.

Their children included:
 Thomas Blackwell (also a future principal of Marischal College)
 George Blackwell, minister of Bathgate
 Alexander Blackwell tortured and beheaded in Sweden in 1747
 Janet, married George Fordyce, Provost of Aberdeen parents to Sir William Fordyce, David Fordyce, James Fordyce and Alexander Fordyce
 Christian Blackwell (d.1784), married John French, advocate in Aberdeen

Publications
Ratio Sacra (1710)
Schema Sacra (1710)
Methodus Evangelica (1712)
Representation against the Bill for Restoring Patronages (1712)

Artistic recognition
His portrait (artist unknown) is held by the Seven Incorporated Trades of Aberdeen.

References

1660 births
1728 deaths
People from Glasgow
Alumni of the University of Glasgow
Academics of the University of Aberdeen
17th-century Ministers of the Church of Scotland
18th-century Ministers of the Church of Scotland